Up! is the fourth studio album by Canadian singer Shania Twain. It was released on November 19, 2002, by Mercury Nashville. As her first studio album in five years, three versions of the album were released: a pop version (red disc), a country version (green disc), and a version in the style of Indian film music (blue disc); all three discs feature distinctly identifiable picture labels (for example, Twain sports a cowboy hat on the green country disc). Up! spawned eight singles; "I’m Gonna Getcha Good!", "Up!", "Ka-Ching!", "Forever and for Always" "Thank You Baby!", "She’s Not Just a Pretty Face" "When You Kiss Me", and "It Only Hurts When I’m Breathing", with six of these being sent to country radio. 

In the US, Up! debuted at No. 1 with sales of 874,000 copies. On September 23, 2004, the RIAA certified Up! at 11× Platinum, giving her the distinction of being the only female artist to have three consecutive diamond albums released in the United States. The album was promoted with interviews and television performances including the Super Bowl XXXVII halftime show. It was further promoted with the successful Up! Tour, which visited North America and Europe, and eight singles with each accompanied by a music video.

Production 
Writing and recording for the album took place across the world. According to the album booklet, Twain and Lange wrote and recorded in Berlin, Rome, Vienna, Paris, Avignon, Provence, Milan, Dublin, the Bahamas (at the famous Compass Point Studios), The Grenadine Islands, and Mumbai. For the blue international disc, the pair enlisted British-Asian music producers Simon and Diamond Duggal for production collaboration. Canadian folk music group Leahy provided group fiddles throughout the album.

Release and promotion 
When the album was originally released, different regions received different versions of the album. North America received a two-disc set, containing the red disc and the green disc. Most international markets received a two-disc set, referred to as the "International Version," containing the red disc and the blue disc. Both two-disc versions contain a note from Shania offering free downloads of whichever set of mixes not included (e.g. a download of the blue version is offered with the red/green set), for a limited time on her website. Australia received both two-disc sets, with the red/green version being subtitled "U.S. Version". The album was later re-released in some territories as a single-disc set, containing only the red mixes, and an alternate cover with a red background.

The red and green versions were released on vinyl in the United States and Europe on October 14, 2016. They are sold separately, and are featured on translucent red and green vinyl, respectively. This marks the first time the green version was released physically in Europe.

Twain launched an extensive promotional tour for the album, starting in October 2002. Major events included the Super Bowl XXXVII halftime show, the 2002 and 2003 Country Music Association Awards, the 2003 American Music Awards, the 2003 Juno Awards, the 2003 ECHO Awards, the 2003 Billboard Music Awards, and the 2003 CMT Flameworthy Awards.

On October 2, 2002, Twain performed on the Dutch program TROS TV Show. On October 5 she appeared on Wetten, dass..?. On October 19 she appeared on the BBC show Parkinson and on France's Star Academy. On October 26 she filmed a mini-concert for CD:UK. On November 6, she launched the US leg of the promotional tour by opening the 2002 Country Music Awards. On November 24, Twain performed in Edmonton at the 2002 Grey Cup halftime show.

Twain embarked on the successful Up! Tour in September 2003.

Critical reception 

Upon its release, the album received positive reviews from most music critics, based on an aggregate score of 72/100 from Metacritic. AllMusic editor Stephen Thomas Erlewine rated it 4.5/5 stars, praising Twain for: "writing well crafted songs as universal anthems, so listeners can hear themselves within these tales." Erlewine further commented that: "The album had big, polished, multipurpose hooks and big, sweeping emotions. This is Super-Size pop, as outsized and grandiose as good pop should be", he concluded. Matthew Bjorke from About.com rated it four-stars out of five and said that: "This 19 track opus is sure to please most fans of both pop and modern country." The Blender review was also positive, saying that: "Twain's songs are never deep, but they have hooks tattooed on their skin and harmonies that glow like bar lights." Also with a positive review, Billboard said that: "[It's] quintessential Shania, light as vapor, sweet as sugar, rendered with personality and undeniable charisma. Expect precious metal." Andrew Lynch from Entertainment.ie rated it three-stars out of five and said that: "The songs, themselves, meanwhile, are as bland and one-dimensional as they were on the smash hit Come on Over, sassily upbeat stuff with a dash of girl power thrown in for good measure. A high proportion of them, however, are also infuriatingly catchy – suggesting that Twain may well have another global success on her hands."

Chris Willman from Entertainment Weekly was largely positive with the album, gaving an "A" grade for the album, comparing the album to "ABBA's  Gold without all the melancholy." He also complemented "the sheer exuberance and joy of craftsmanship in this double-Up!-manship don't feel like mercenary insincerity. They resemble something like actual generosity... not to put too fine a point on it." The PopMatters review was average, giving it six stars out of ten and saying that the album "got everything from dance numbers to ballads, and it's vintage Shania". The review further said that: "Up! is a sense of Twain trying – desperately trying at all levels – to touch everyone, to express universal truths by artificial means: beats, tempos, instruments, etc." The review concluded that: "Up! is too generic and emotionless for that level of diversity, but in a very real sense, Twain has taken country music to its next level of popularity where country and pop are virtually indistinguishable." Robert Christgau on his Consumer Guide Review praised the tracks "I'm Gonna Getcha Good! " and "Ka-Ching!". The Rolling Stone review was positive, rating it four-stars out of five and saying that: "Up! would be a knockout even if it were limited to its one disc of country music.... But the second, relentlessly kinetic pop disc is a revelation." Jennifer Nine from Yahoo! Music rated it six-stars out of ten, saying that: "'Up!' is not without its little oddities and delights." And concluded that: "'Up!' takes on its all-things-to-all-wallets mission with real appetite." Alanna Nash from Amazon was largely positive and concluded that: "There's something oddly hypnotic about much of this project, and it may be simply hearing what Shania can do when she abandons the pretense of being a country singer and concentrates on music. Call this a guilty pleasure—pop, country, or somewhere in between."

Commercial performance 
Up! debuted at No. 1 on both the Billboard Top Country Albums chart and the all-genre Billboard 200, selling 874,000 copies in its first week of release. In its second week, it remained at the top spot on both charts, selling 623,000 copies. In its third week, sales were still strong enough to top both charts again, selling more than 317,000 copies and beating Tim McGraw's Tim McGraw and the Dancehall Doctors, which held the No. 2 spot for a second consecutive week. The album remained at No. 1 after its fourth week of release, selling more than 373,000 copies. Its last reign on the all-genre chart was after its fifth week. The album's five-week total alone stands at an estimated 2,646,000 units. The RIAA certified the album 11× platinum (Diamond), denoting shipments of 5.5 million in the United States; the RIAA counts each disc separately for certification purposes. It stayed in the Top 200 of the Billboard top 200 albums sales chart for more than 60 weeks.

The album was also certified diamond in Canada 17 days after its release date.

In 2007, the album's cover was listed on Maxims Sexiest Album Covers.

Track listing
All songs are written by Shania Twain and Robert John "Mutt" Lange. Track lengths correspond to the red, green and blue disc versions, respectively.

Singles chronology

United States
 "I'm Gonna Getcha Good!"
 "Up!"
 "Forever and for Always"
 "She's Not Just a Pretty Face"
 "It Only Hurts When I'm Breathing"
 "When You Kiss Me"

Europe
 "I'm Gonna Getcha Good!"
 "Ka-Ching!"
 "Forever And For Always"
 "She's Not Just a Pretty Face"
 "Thank You Baby! (For Makin' Someday Come So Soon)
 "When You Kiss Me"
 "Up!"

United Kingdom
 "I'm Gonna Getcha Good!"
 "Ka-Ching!"
 "Forever and for Always"
 "Thank You Baby! (For Makin' Someday Come So Soon)"
 "When You Kiss Me / Up!" (Double A side)

Music videos
 "I'm Gonna Getcha Good!"
 "Up!"
 "Ka-Ching!"
 "Forever and for Always"
 "Thank You Baby! (For Makin' Someday Come So Soon)"
 "When You Kiss Me"
 "She's Not Just a Pretty Face"
 "It Only Hurts When I'm Breathing"

Personnel 
Rakesh Chaurasia – flute
Cory Churko – slide guitar, soloist
Kevin Churko – programming
Sunil Das – sitar
Diamond Duggal – bouzouki, coral sitar, bass guitar, synthesizer guitar, keyboards, mandolin, percussion
Simon Duggal – bass guitar, darbouka, dholak, drum programming, keyboards, percussion, tabla
Paul Franklin – pedal steel guitar
Gavin Greenaway – string arrangements
The Irish Film Orchestra – strings
Robert John "Mutt" Lange – background vocals
Paul Leim – drums
Brent Mason – electric guitar
Mauro Pagini – background vocals
Chintoo Singh – rabab
Jatinder Thakur – violin
Michael Thompson – electric guitar, slide guitar
Shania Twain – lead vocals, background vocals
Sanjay Vyas – tabla
John Willis – banjo, bouzouki, acoustic guitar, mandolin
Jonathan Yudkin – cello, mandolin, violin

Charts

Weekly charts

Up! (Country Mixes)

All-time charts

Year-end charts

Certifications and sales

See also 
 List of best-selling albums by women
 List of best-selling albums in Canada
 List of best-selling albums in the United States

References 

2002 albums
Shania Twain albums
Mercury Nashville albums
Albums produced by Robert John "Mutt" Lange
Canadian Country Music Association Album of the Year albums
Canadian Country Music Association Top Selling Album albums
Juno Award for Country Album of the Year albums